Liběšice is a municipality and village in Litoměřice District in the Ústí nad Labem Region of the Czech Republic. It has about 1,500 inhabitants.

Administrative parts
Villages and hamlets of Dolní Chobolice, Dolní Nezly, Dolní Řepčice, Horní Chobolice, Horní Nezly, Jeleč, Klokoč, Lhotsko, Mladé, Nová Vesnička, Soběnice, Srdov, Trnobrany and Zimoř are administrative parts of Liběšice.

References

Villages in Litoměřice District